The 1912 Auckland City mayoral election was part of the New Zealand local elections held that same year. In 1912, elections were held for the Mayor of Auckland. The polling was conducted using the standard first-past-the-post electoral method.

Background
The mayoral contest was viewed with great interest as it followed a recent industrial dispute. Sitting mayor James Parr was challenged by Alfred Hall-Skelton, who had the endorsement of the Federation of Labour. Parr claimed not to be an opponent of Labour but was against "revolutionary agitators".

Mayoralty results

Notes

References

Mayoral elections in Auckland
1912 elections in New Zealand
Politics of the Auckland Region
1910s in Auckland